Louis-Marie-François Tardy de Montravel, often  Louis Tardy de Montravel  (28 September 1811, in Vincennes – 4 October 1864, in Elbeuf)  was a French admiral, explorer and colonial administrator.  He served as the second commandant of New Caledonia from 1 January 1854 to 31 October 1854.

References

1811 births
1864 deaths
French Navy admirals
Governors of French Guiana
Commandants of New Caledonia
French explorers